Dorothea Elisabeth of Schleswig-Holstein (1 September 1629 – 18 March 1687) was the daughter of king Christian IV of Denmark and Kirsten Munk.

As were her siblings, she was raised by her grandmother Ellen Marsvin. She was known as Miss leftover, as the king did not recognize her as his child, believing her to be the daughter of Otto Louis of Salm. Marsvin tried to have her recognized, but failed, and in 1637, she was sent to Hamburg and then to a convent school in Cologne. She converted to Roman Catholicism from Lutheranism, religion of her parents, and became a nun there in 1646. She was legitimized in 1648.

Ancestry

References 
 http://www.kvinfo.dk/side/597/bio/1163/origin/170/ (in Danish)
 http://www.kvinfo.dk/side/597/bio/1414/origin/170/ (in Danish)
 Dansk biografisk Lexikon / IV. Bind. Clemens - Eynden (in Danish)

1629 births
1687 deaths
Converts to Roman Catholicism from Lutheranism
17th-century Danish nobility
Danish Roman Catholics
17th-century Danish people
17th-century German Lutheran nuns
D
Daughters of kings